Pampa (Kannada: ಆದಿಕವಿ ಪಂಪ), called by the honorific Ādikavi ("First Poet") was a Kannada-language Jain poet whose works reflected his philosophical beliefs. A court poet of Vemulavada Chalukya king Arikesari II, he was a feudatory of the Rashtrakuta dynasty king Krishna III. Pampa is best known for his epics Vikramārjuna Vijaya or Pampa Bharata, and the Ādi purāṇa, both written in the champu style around c.939. These works served as the model for all future champu works in Kannada.

The works of Jain writers Pampa, Sri Ponna and Ranna, collectively called the "Three gems of Kannada literature", heralded the 10th century era of medieval Kannada literature.

Early life

There are varying opinions about the early life and native language of Pampa. While it is commonly believed Pampa belonged to a Brahmin family that took to Jainism, their actual place of origin and native is debated. According to the trilingual inscription (in Sanskrit, Kannada  and Telugu) installed by Pampa's younger brother Jinavallabha at Bommalamma Gutta in Kurikiyala village, Gangadharam mandal (in modern day Telangana), his father was Abhimanadevaraya (also known as Bhimappayya) and mother was Abbanabbe. It also indicated that his grandfather was Abhimanachandra who belonged to the Brahmin caste and hailed from Vangiparru in Kammanadu, Guntur district, Andhra Pradesh. In the eastern Deccan ruled by Chalukyas of Vengi and Vemulavada was considered as Kannada speaking territory under the rule of Chalukyas and Rashtrakutas, noted Kannada poets like Pampa and Ponna hailed from Vengi. Kannada dynasties like Chalukyas and Rashtrakutas had dominated the whole of Deccan and influence of the Kannada language was felt from the Kaveri and Godavari and even beyond. Hence there were many Kannada families residing in modern Telanaga and Andhra Padesh and Pampa was one of them. According to the modern Jain scholar Hampa Nagarajaiah ("Hampana"), Pampa was born in Annigeri, spent his early childhood on the banks of the nearby Varada river and his mother Abbanabbe was the grand daughter of Joyisa Singha of Annigeri in the modern Dharwad district of Karnataka state. Frequent descriptions of the beauty of the Banavasi region (in the modern Uttara Kannada district) and even the sprinkling (abhishek) of water from the Varada river on Arjuna's head during his coronation in Pampa's epic Vikramarjuna Vijaya testifies to the poet's attachment to the Banavasi region. Through the lines aarankusamittodam nenevudenna manam banvaasi deshamam and puttidirdode maridumbiyaagi men kogileyaagi nandanavanadol banavaasideshadol he has expressed his deep attachment towards Banavasi.

Poetic life
A well-travelled man, he settled down as the court poet of King Arikesari II. Flattered by his knowledge and poetic abilities, Arikesari (who possessed the title Gunarnava) conferred on him the title Kavita Gunarnava. At the age of 39 he wrote his first masterpiece, Ādi purāṇa, in 941, and a little later he completed Vikramarjuna Vijaya popularly known as Pampa Bharata. These two works have remained unparalleled works of classic Kannada composition.

Adipurana
The Ādi purāṇa, written in the champu style, a mixed form of prose and verse, is a Kannada version of the Sanskrit work by Jinasena and details in sixteen cantos the life of the first Tirthankara of Jainism, Rishabha. The work focuses in his own unique style the pilgrimage of a soul to perfection and attainment of moksha. In the work, Pampa describes the struggle for power and control over the entire world of two brothers Bharata and Bahubali, sons of Rishabha. While Bahubali wins, he renounces the worldly pursuits in favour of his brother. Many Jain puranas of Middle Ages found a role model in this work.

Further reading

Notes

Sources

External links

 

Poets from Karnataka
History of Karnataka
Kannada poets
10th-century Indian Jain poets
Kannada people
Indian male poets
10th-century Indian poets